The 1974 European Figure Skating Championships was a senior-level international competition held in Zagreb, Yugoslavia from January 29 to February 2. Elite senior-level figure skaters from European ISU member nations competed for the title of European Champion in the disciplines of men's singles, ladies' singles, pair skating, and ice dancing.

Results

Men

Ladies

Pairs

Ice dancing

References

External links
 results

European Figure Skating Championships, 1974
European Figure Skating Championships, 1974
European Figure Skating Championships
International figure skating competitions hosted by Yugoslavia
1974 in Yugoslav sport
Sports competitions in Zagreb
1970s in Zagreb
January 1974 sports events in Europe
February 1974 sports events in Europe